Pål Henning Albertsen (born 4 December 1975) is a retired Norwegian football goalkeeper and later goalkeeping coach.

He grew up in FK Vidar and became a youth international. In 1996 he was loaned out to Eliteserien club Strømsgodset. This season Strømsgodset encountered a number of goalkeeper problems, heavily stricken by injuries, the team used both Pål Henning Albertsen, Glenn Arne Hansen, Roar Gulliksen, Per Øyvind Dahl, Tom Nilsen and Jon Knudsen. In Albertsen's three matches, Strømsgodset conceded 14 goals. Albertsen nonetheless made a permanent move to Strømsgodset. In 1998 he wanted regular first-team play and went on to Ullern IF, only to return to Strømsgodset post-season. This did not last long either as he moved back to Oslo and FK Oslo Øst in 2000. After a few months he moved on to Kjelsås.

In 2002 Albertsen began a new chapter as player in Larvik clubs, first for Larvik Fotball, then after that became defunct, IF Fram Larvik. In September 2006 he made his debut for FK Tønsberg. Ahead of the 2007 season his contract was not renewed, so he took a job as goalkeeping coach of Stabæk. In Stabæk he coached Jon Knudsen, one of the many Strømsgodset goalkeepers in 1996, who now reached the national team, praising Pål Henning Albertsen's input in the process. At the same time Albertsen played on the fourth tier for Svarstad IL in Lardal outside of Larvik, but here he was sacked in May 2007 for erratic on-pitch behaviour. He retired, but in 2011 and 2012 he was effectively Stabæk's third-choice goalkeeper, appearing in a pre-season friendly as well as for their B team. Job-wise, in 2013 he moved back to Larvik as director of sports in Fram Larvik. In 2013 he appeared as a player for seventh-tier team Nanset IF, and in 2014 he made one emergency appearance for Fram Larvik. He was behind the signing of former Stabæk player and manager Petter Belsvik as new Fram Larvik manager in 2014. In late 2015 he signed as goalkeeper coach of Henan Jianye in China, He lasted until April 2016, returning to a civic job in Norway. In 2017 and 2018 he was the goalkeeper coach of Strømsgodset. In 2019 he became the new managing director of the handball club Larvik HK, taking over for Petter Belsvik.

References

1979 births
Living people
Sportspeople from Stavanger
Norwegian footballers
Norway youth international footballers
Norway under-21 international footballers
FK Vidar players
Strømsgodset Toppfotball players
Ullern IF players
Manglerud Star Toppfotball players
Kjelsås Fotball players
IF Fram Larvik players
FK Tønsberg players
Norwegian First Division players
Eliteserien players
Association football goalkeepers
Association football goalkeeping coaches
Stabæk Fotball non-playing staff
Strømsgodset Toppfotball non-playing staff
Norwegian expatriate sportspeople in China